Sincansarnıç is a neighborhood of Mustafakemalpaşa in Bursa Province, Turkey.

Geography 
It is 115 km from Bursa city center and 30 km from Mustafakemalpaşa district.

Population

References 

Villages in Mustafakemalpaşa District